Hart Creek is a stream in the U.S. state of Georgia.

Hart Creek was named after a pioneer settler. A variant name is Harts Creek.

References

Rivers of Georgia (U.S. state)
Rivers of McDuffie County, Georgia
Rivers of Taliaferro County, Georgia
Rivers of Warren County, Georgia